The 2007 UCI Cyclo-cross World Championships – Men's junior race was held on Saturday 27 January 2007 as a part of the 2007 UCI Cyclo-cross World Championships in Hooglede-Gits, Belgium.

Ranking

Two riders, Mattias Nilsson from Sweden and Eduardo Recasens Gasso from Spain, were disqualified for riding through the pits without changing bikes.

Notes

External links
 Union Cycliste Internationale

UCI Cyclo-cross World Championships – Men's junior race
Men's junior race
2007 in cyclo-cross